William Cook (6 September 1887 – 10 June 1949) was an Australian rules footballer who played with Carlton in the Victorian Football League (VFL).

Cook kicked five goals in his VFL debut and was a centre half-forward in Carlton's 1914 premiership team. He was their leading goal-kicker that year with 27 goals, in what was his only league season.

References

External links

1887 births
1949 deaths
Australian rules footballers from Victoria (Australia)
Australian Rules footballers: place kick exponents
Carlton Football Club players
Carlton Football Club Premiership players
One-time VFL/AFL Premiership players